The West Okaw River is a tributary of the Kaskaskia River, which it joins in Moultrie County, Illinois. The West Okaw forms an arm of Lake Shelbyville where the natural rivers used to meet.

The West Okaw is the western fork of the Kaskaskia, which was formerly known as the Okaw. The name "Okaw" comes from the Mississippi Valley French au Kaskaskies ("to the Kaskaskias"), which was commonly shortened to au Kas. The town of Okawville is located close to the Kaskaskia, but about 100 miles downstream from the West Okaw. The Okaw Valley Council of the Boy Scouts of America is also centered on the Kaskaskia River, far downstream from the West Okaw.

This figure includes the drainage ditches, which extend the stream about eight miles above the natural channel.

The watershed of the West Okaw was formed during the Wisconsin glaciation, about 70,000 to 10,000 years before present. The Wisconsin ice sheet advanced roughly to the Lake Shelbyville Dam, forming a terminal moraine. The meltwater overtopped the moraine, forming the modern Kaskaskia River, which flowed on through land of older Illinoian Stage.

Cities, towns and counties
The following cities, towns and villages are in the West Okaw watershed:
Bethany
Dalton City
Hammond
LaPlace
Lovington

Parts of the following Illinois counties are drained by the West Okaw:
Macon County
Moultrie County
Piatt County
Shelby County

See also
List of Illinois rivers

References

External links
Fish Illinois Lake Shelbyville
Prairie Rivers Network
TopoQuest, West Okaw Fish and Wildlife Management Area
USGS Real-Time Stream Gage, West Okaw at Lovington

Rivers of Illinois
Rivers of Macon County, Illinois
Rivers of Moultrie County, Illinois
Rivers of Piatt County, Illinois
Rivers of Shelby County, Illinois